Au Bon Pain (meaning "at (or 'to') the Good Bread") is an American fast casual restaurant, bakery, and café chain headquartered in Richardson, Texas and operates 175 locations in the United States, and Thailand. The company is currently owned by AMPEX Brands.

Au Bon Pain serves baked goods such as bread, pastries, croissants, and bagels as well as tea, coffee and espresso beverages, breakfast foods such as egg sandwiches, and lunch items such as soup, salads, and sandwiches. The company also offers catering services.

Most of the company's locations are found on the East Coast of the United States, notably Philadelphia, New York City, and Boston. Locations are either company-owned or franchised. Most of the company-owned locations are in Boston, Chicago, New York, Philadelphia, Pittsburgh and Washington D.C. while franchise locations are operating in 19 states around the country, as well as internationally. The business model currently favors locations at colleges, hospitals and transportation stations.

History
Pavailler, a French manufacturer of baking equipment, established the company as a showcase for its ovens in 1976 at Faneuil Hall in Boston. The company's principals included Louis Rapuano, Pavailler, and two minor investors. Pavailler contributed baking machinery to the venture. Au Bon Pain sold croissants, pastries, and bread produced by French bakers. In 1977, it opened stores in Hackensack, New Jersey and New York City.

The business model was changed to sell baked goods instead of ovens. Francois Marin was hired to open and manage the first Au Bon Pain in Boston's Quincy Market.

In 1981, the company was suffering from its debt and on the verge of bankruptcy, and a 60% interest in the company was acquired by Ronald M. Shaich and his father.

In 1991, the company listed on the stock market via an initial public offering.

The company also acquired the U.S. bakery locations of Warburtons, which were converted to Au Bon Pain locations.

In 1996, the company announced plans to upgrade the interior of its stores after reporting a loss.

In 1997, the company considered opening locations in Peru.

In 1999, Au Bon Pain Co. Inc. (later renamed Panera Bread) sold its Au Bon Pain division to Bruckmann, Rosser, Sherrill & Co. In 2000, it was sold to Compass Group.

In 2000, the company reached a franchise agreement with Gourmet Coffee Co. Ltd. of Taiwan to open the first locations of Au Bon Pain in Taipei.

In 2005, Au Bon Pain management, in partnership with PNC Financial Services, purchased 75% of the company; Compass Group retained the remaining 25%.

In March 2008, LNK Partners, a private equity firm, acquired a controlling interest in the company.

In 2011, all of its locations were renovated in a major remodeling program.

In 2013, the company announced that by 2017, it would only use free-range eggs.

In 2014, under the leadership of Sue Morelli, Au Bon Pain was named one of the top women-led businesses in Massachusetts.

In January 2015, Au Bon Pain hired Katherine See as Executive Chef.

In 2015, UNITE HERE, a labor union, targeted the company's employees at Philadelphia International Airport. The union published a report that the company was underperforming.

In June 2016, Morelli retired and Ray Blanchette was named President and CEO.

On November 8, 2017, Panera Bread announced the acquisition of Au Bon Pain, which had split off from Panera in 1999 after being created in 1981. Following the deal, Ron Shaich stepped down as the Au Bon Pain's chief executive, to be succeeded by Blaine Hurst, Panera's president.

In 2018, the company looked to close its 9 locations in Washington, D.C. or convert them to Panera Bread locations.

In December 2019, Au Bon Pain closed its last location in Cambridge, Massachusetts, ending over 35 years of doing business in their former flagship city.

In June 2021, AMPEX Brands purchased the chain from Panera Bread in a deal which included around $60 million in assets. The deal ensured the preservation of the Au Bon Pain brand in light of the closing and conversion of various Au Bon Pain locations into Panera Bread locations. AMPEX Brands declined to disclose the exact value of the deal, but confirmed the inclusion of assets and franchise rights for 131 additional locations.  AMPEX Brands also concurrently announced the move of the company's headquarters from Boston to its own headquarters in Texas.

See also
 List of coffeehouse chains
 List of bakery cafés

References

External links 

 

1976 establishments in Massachusetts
1978 mergers and acquisitions
1981 mergers and acquisitions
1999 mergers and acquisitions
2000 mergers and acquisitions
2005 mergers and acquisitions
2008 mergers and acquisitions
2017 mergers and acquisitions
2021 mergers and acquisitions
Bakeries of the United States
Bakery cafés
Fast casual restaurants
Fast-food chains of the United States
Fast-food franchises
Private equity portfolio companies
Regional restaurant chains in the United States
Restaurant franchises
Restaurants established in 1976
Companies based in Texas
Restaurants in Texas